This is a list of the number-one songs in Canada during the year 2011.

The chart is published in canoe.ca every Thursday.

Chart history

See also
List of Canadian Hot 100 number-one singles of 2011
List of number-one albums of 2011 (Canada)
List of number-one music downloads of 2010 (Canada)
List of number-one digital songs of 2012 (Canada)

References

External links
Current Hot Digital Canadian Songs

Canada Digital Songs
Digital 2011
2011 in Canadian music